Great Britain competed at the 2022 World Games held in Birmingham, United States from 7 to 17 July 2022. Athletes representing Great Britain won six gold medals, three silver medals and four bronze medals. The country finished in 13th place in the medal table.

Medalists

Invitational sports

Competitors
The following is the list of number of competitors in the Games.

Acrobatic gymnastics

Great Britain won one gold medal in acrobatic gymnastics.

Archery

Great Britain won two medals in archery.

Recurve / barebow

Compound

Canoe marathon

Great Britain competed in canoe marathon.

Canoe polo

Great Britain competed in canoe polo.

Cue sports

Great Britain won two medals in cue sports.

Flying disc

Great Britain competed in the flying disc competition.

Lacrosse

Great Britain competed in lacrosse.

Muaythai

Great Britain won one gold medal in muaythai.

Orienteering

Great Britain won one bronze medal in orienteering.

Parkour

Great Britain won one bronze medal in parkour.

Powerlifting

Great Britain won one bronze medal in powerlifting.

Men

Women

Squash

Great Britain won one silver medal in squash.

Trampoline gymnastics

Great Britain competed in trampoline gymnastics.

Tug of war

Great Britain won two medals in tug of war.

Water skiing

Great Britain competed in water skiing.

Wheelchair rugby

Great Britain won the gold medal in the wheelchair rugby tournament.

Wushu

Great Britain competed in wushu.

References

Nations at the 2022 World Games
2022
World Games